The 1978 Omloop Het Volk was the 33rd edition of the Omloop Het Volk cycle race and was held on 4 March 1978. The race started and finished in Ghent. The race was won by Freddy Maertens.

General classification

References

1978
Omloop Het Nieuwsblad
Omloop Het Nieuwsblad